The 2012–13 Rostov season was the fourth straight season that the club played in the Russian Premier League, the highest tier of football in Russia after they won their relegation playoff tie against Shinnik Yaroslavl. They will also play in the 2012–13 Russian Cup.

Squad 

 (captain)

 

The following players are listed on the official club's website as reserves and are registered with the Premier League. They are eligible to play for the main squad.

Reserve squad

Transfers

Summer

In:

Out:

Winter

In:

Out:

Competitions

Russian Premier League

Results

Table

Relegation play-offs

Russian Cup

Squad statistics

Appearances and goals

|-
|colspan="14"|Players left Rostov during the season:

|}

Goal scorers

Clean sheets

Disciplinary record

References

FC Rostov seasons
Rostov